Carolyn Wilson Harris (December 8, 1849 – May 3, 1910) was vice president of the Sullivant Moss Society during 1904–1905 and charge of the Lichen Department from 1901–1905. She also wrote many articles on various lichen genera and species. She was known for being an indefatigable worker, and did much to popularize the study of lichens; her help was always given freely and cheerfully to those who applied to her for assistance in their studies.

Early life 
Harris was born Carolyn Wilson in Springfield, Ohio. Around 1885, Harris and her husband purchased land on Chilson Lake, in Essex County, New York.

Career

The Sullivant Moss Society 
Harris was an active member of the Sullivant Moss Chapter, originally formed as a Moss Chapter of the Agassiz Association, and founded by Abel Joel Grout and Elizabeth Gertrude Knight Britton, and eventually renamed the Sullivant Moss Society. Harris contributed new plants to the Society from around Chilson Lake and helped to determine the classification of other members' submissions. She served as organizer and first head of the Society's Lichen Department from 1901 to 1905, and its Vice-President from 1904-1905. She donated many specimens to the Society's lichen herbarium.

The Sullivant Moss Chapter is now known as the American Bryological and Lichenological Society.

The Bryologist 
Harris was the first to publish about lichens in The Bryologist, a scientific journal devoted primarily to mosses, which was edited by Abel Joel Grout and Annie Morrill Smith. Harris published a series of 12 papers on lichens (see Publications), which provided beginners with an overview of their physiology and directions on how to identify and distinguish them from mosses. With careful textual descriptions, illustrations, and photographs, Harris hoped to describe lichens well enough that they could be recognized with a simple hand lens.

Personal life 
Harris was married to Isaac Harris (1838–1907) of Brooklyn, New York. They had one son, Wilson Park Harris.

In 1905, Harris contracted a serious illness which prevented her from continuing her work with the Sullivan Moss Society. She died of pneumonia on May 3, 1910 in Lakewood, New Jersey.

Works and publications 

Note: Those marked with an (*) were published anonymously

References

American lichenologists
1849 births
1910 deaths
Deaths from pneumonia in New Jersey
People from Springfield, Ohio
Women bryologists
Women lichenologists
Scientists from Ohio
American women botanists